Contact, is the third studio album by Platinum Blonde, was released in 1987. Canadian sales of Alien Shores and Contact exceeded 100,000 copies.  The album reached a high of 20 on the Canadian charts.

Track list

Credits 
Platinum Blonde:
 Sergio Galli: guitar, backing vocals
 Mark Holmes: lead and backing vocals, guitar
 Kenny MacLean: bass, guitar, keyboards, backing vocals
 Sascha Tukatsch: drums, percussion

with:

 David Bendeth: guitar
 Jeff Bova: keyboards
 Michelle Cobbs: backing vocals
 Claude Desjardins: percussion, keyboards, drums
 Bernard Edwards: bass
 Peter Fredette: backing vocals
 Eddie Martinez: guitar
 B.J. Nelson: backing vocals
 Lou Pomanti: bass, keyboards
 Fonzi Thornton of Chic (band): backing vocals
 Uptown Horns: horns
 Tony Thompson: drums, percussion
 Tom Weir: drums, percussion

Engineers:
 Jay Mark, Scott Church, Don Wershba, Bruce Robbins, Randy Staub

References

External links 
 Platinum Blonde Official Website

1987 albums
Platinum Blonde (band) albums
Albums produced by David Bendeth
Albums produced by Bernard Edwards
CBS Records albums